Alfonso VIII (11 November 11555 October 1214), called the Noble (El Noble) or the one of Las Navas (el de las Navas), was King of Castile from 1158 to his death and King of Toledo. After having suffered a great defeat with his own army at Alarcos against the Almohads in 1195, he led the coalition of Christian princes and foreign crusaders who broke the power of the Almohads in the Battle of Las Navas de Tolosa in 1212, an event which marked the arrival of a tide of Christian supremacy on the Iberian peninsula.

His reign saw the domination of Castile over León and, by his alliance with Aragon, he drew those two spheres of Christian Iberia into close connection.

Regency and civil war
Alfonso was born to Sancho III of Castile and Blanche, in Soria on 11 November 1155. He was named after his grandfather Alfonso VII of León and Castile, who divided his kingdoms between his sons. This division set the stage for conflict in the family until the kingdoms were re-united by Alfonso VIII's grandson, Ferdinand III of Castile.

His early life resembled that of other medieval kings. His father died in 1158. Though proclaimed king when only two years of age, Alfonso was regarded as merely nominal by the unruly nobles to whom a minority was convenient. Immediately, Castile was plunged into conflicts between the various noble houses vying for ascendancy in the inevitable regency. The devotion of a squire of his household, who carried him on the pommel of his saddle to the stronghold of San Esteban de Gormaz, saved him from falling into the hands of the contending factions. The noble houses of Lara and Castro both claimed the regency, as did the boy's uncle, Ferdinand II of León. In 1159 the young Alfonso was put briefly in the custody of García Garcés de Aza, who was not wealthy enough to support him. In March 1160 the Castro and Lara met at the Battle of Lobregal and the Castro were victorious, but the guardianship of Alfonso and the regency fell to Manrique Pérez de Lara.

Alfonso was put in the custody of the loyal village Ávila. At barely fifteen, he began restoring his kingdom to order. It was only by surprise that he recovered his capital Toledo from the hands of the Laras.

Marriage and foreign relations
During the regency, his uncle Sancho VI of Navarre took advantage of the chaos and the king's minority to seize lands along the border, including much of La Rioja. In 1170, Alfonso sent an embassy to Bordeaux to Henry II of England and Eleanor of Aquitaine to seek the hand of their daughter Eleanor. The marriage treaty helped provide Alfonso with a powerful ally against his uncle. In 1176, Alfonso asked his father-in-law to arbitrate the disputed border territories. While Alfonso received back much that had been taken from him, he had to pay significant monetary compensation.

In 1186, he recuperated part of La Rioja from the Kingdom of Navarre.

In 1187, Alfonso negotiated with Frederick I, Holy Roman Emperor, who was seeking to marry his son Conrad to Alfonso's eldest child and heir, Berengaria. In April 1188, they agreed on a treaty in Seligenstadt, which made clear that she was the heir of Castile after any sons of Alfonso and that Conrad would only co-rule as her spouse. That became relevant in her ultimate succession to the throne even though the marriage to Conrad was never consummated and later annulled. The treaty also documented traditional rights and obligations between the sovereign and the nobles in Castile. In July 1188, Alfonso convened his court in Carrión de los Condes to allow the nobles to review and ratify the treaty. At that court, Alfonso knighted both Conrad and Alfonso IX of León, who would ultimately marry Berengaria. The younger Alfonso had come to seek the support and acknowledgement of his ascent to the throne of León from his older cousin. The elder Alfonso granted that in exchange for acknowledgement that the king of Castile was overlord of the king of León.

The relationship between the cousins Alfonso continued to be filled with conflict. In 1194, the papal legate negotiated a treaty between them to temporarily end the conflict. However, after Castile was defeated at the Battle of Alarcos, the younger Alfonso seized the opportunity to again attack his cousin.  Castille defended itself with papal support. A more lasting peace was achieved finally by the older Alfonso's daughter Berengaria marrying the younger Alfonso in 1197. The annulment of this marriage by the pope drove the younger Alfonso to again attack his cousin in 1204, but treaties made in 1205, 1207, and 1209 each forced him to concede further territories and rights. The treaty in 1207 is the first existing public document in the Castilian dialect.

Around 1200 when his brother in law John was on the English throne, Alfonso began to claim that Gascony was part of Eleanor's dowry, though there was nothing in the marriage treaty to indicate this. In 1205, he invaded, hoping to make good on his claim. By 1208, he gave up on the venture, though his heirs would come back to this claim generations later.

Reconquista
In 1174, he ceded Uclés to the Order of Santiago and afterwards this became the order's principal seat. From Uclés, he began a campaign which culminated in the reconquest of Cuenca in 1177. The city surrendered on 21 September, the feast of Saint Matthew, ever afterwards celebrated by the citizens of the town.

Alfonso took the initiative to ally all Christian kingdoms of the peninsula — Navarre, León, Portugal, and Aragon — against the Almohads. By the Treaty of Cazola of 1179, the zones of expansion of each kingdom were defined.

After founding Plasencia (Cáceres) in 1186, he embarked on a major initiative to unite the Castilian nobility around the Reconquista.

In 1195, after the treaty with the Almohads was broken, he came to the defence of Alarcos on the river Guadiana, then the principal Castilian town in the region. At the subsequent Battle of Alarcos, he was roundly defeated by the caliph Abu Yusuf Yaqub al-Mansur. The reoccupation of the surrounding territory by the Almohads was quickly commenced with Calatrava falling first. For the next seventeen years, the frontier between Moor and Castilian was fixed in the hill country just outside Toledo.

Finally, in 1212, through the mediation of Pope Innocent III, a crusade was called against the Almohads. Castilians under Alfonso, Aragonese and Catalans under Peter II, Navarrese under Sancho VII, and Franks under the archbishop of Narbonne, Arnaud Amalric, all flocked to the effort. The military orders also lent their support. Calatrava first, then Alarcos, and finally Benavente were captured before a final battle was fought at Las Navas de Tolosa near Santa Elena on 16 July. The caliph Muhammad al-Nasir was routed and Almohad power broken.

Cultural legacy
Alfonso was the founder of the first Spanish university, a studium generale at Palencia, which, however, did not survive him. His court also served as an important instrument for Spanish cultural achievement. Alfonso and his wife Eleanor of England were the first to make the Alcázar of Segovia as their residence when this fortress was still at its early stages.

Alfonso died at Gutierre-Muñoz and was succeeded by his surviving son, Henry I.

Alfonso was the subject for Lion Feuchtwanger's novel Die Jüdin von Toledo (The Jewess of Toledo), in which is narrated an affair with a Jewish subject in medieval Toledo in a time when Spain was known to be the land of tolerance and learning for Jews, Christians, and Muslims. The titular Jewish woman of the novel is based on Alfonso's paramour, Rahel la Fermosa.  Scholars continue to debate the historical truth of this relationship. The 1919 film The Jewess of Toledo by Franz Höbling is also based on this relationship.

Children
With Eleanor of England, Alfonso had 11 children:

Through his daughters, Berengaria and Blanche, he was the grandfather of two monarchs who became saints of the Roman Church.

Notes

References

 
 
 

 

 
COSTA, Ricardo da. "Love and Crime, Chastisement and Redemption in Glory in the Crusade of Reconquest: Alfonso VIII of Castile in the battles of Alarcos (1195) and Las Navas de Tolosa (1212)". In: OLIVEIRA, Marco A. M. de (org.). Guerras e Imigrações. Campo Grande: Editora da UFMS, 2004, pp. 73–94 .

1155 births
1214 deaths
12th-century Castilian monarchs
13th-century Castilian monarchs
People from Soria
Castilian House of Burgundy
Medieval child monarchs
Burials at the Abbey of Santa María la Real de Las Huelgas
Leonese infantes
Castilian infantes